Transylvania 90210: Songs of Death, Dying, and the Dead is the first studio album by American horror punk musician Wednesday 13. The album contains fourteen standard tracks, as well as a bonus track exclusive to Japan, titled "Thank You Satan". The album spawned two singles, "I Walked with a Zombie", inspired by the film of the same name, and "Bad Things", which was released only as a promo in the UK to promote the band's upcoming tour.

Concept 
Transylvania 90210 draws mostly from horror punk, with strong influences from heavy metal and gothic metal. It shows how Wednesday 13 has progressed stylistically from his last album, Beyond the Valley of the Murderdolls (with Murderdolls), incorporating less of an alternative metal approach in favour of a more "straight" metal and gothic style.

Wednesday 13 has also stated: "Of the tracks on the new album, Wednesday adds "There are a few surprises that the fans won't expect... The title Transylvania 90210 Songs of Death, Dying, and the Dead comes from the idea of what I think a Wednesday 13 TV show would be like, it's like each song is an episode." Tune in in 2005!"

The album title is a mix-up of the 90210 TV series and Transylvania the home of Count Dracula. Post Mortem Boredom" references the 1972 film The Last House on the Lefts advertising campaign swapping "it's only a movie..." with "it's only a recording...". "Look What the Bats Dragged in" references the Poison album Look What the Cat Dragged In parodying the album title. "I Walked with a Zombie" references the 1930s film I Walked with a Zombie while the music video uses footage of Night of the Living Dead. "House by the Cemetery" is named after Lucio Fulci's The House by the Cemetery. "The Ghost of Vincent Price" is a tribute to horror actor Vincent Price and it references two of his films House of Wax and House on Haunted Hill.

Track listing

Personnel 
Band members
Wednesday 13 – vocals, guitars, bass, keyboards, samples, producer, director, audio production
Piggy D. – backing vocals
Kid Kid – backing vocals
Ghastly – drums

Additional personnel
Ziad – saxophone on "Elect Death for President"
Monte Conner – A&R
Jamie Hoover – engineer, audio engineer
Colin Richardson – mixing
Roger Lian – mastering
Will Bartle – assistant
P. R. Brown – art direction, design, photography

References 

2005 debut albums
Roadrunner Records albums
Wednesday 13 albums